In physics, a force field is a vector field corresponding with a non-contact force acting on a particle at various positions in space. Specifically, a force field is a vector field , where  is the force that a particle would feel if it were at the point .

Examples
Gravity is the force of attraction between two objects. A gravitational force field models this influence that a massive body (or more generally, any quantity of energy) extends into the space around itself. In Newtonian gravity, a particle of mass M creates a gravitational field , where the radial unit vector  points away from the particle.
An electric field  is a vector field.

Work 
Work is dependent on the displacement as well as the force acting on an object. As a particle moves through a force field along a path C, the work done by the force is a line integral

This value is independent of the velocity/momentum that the particle travels along the path.

Conservative force field 
For a conservative force field, it is also independent of the path itself, depending only on the starting and ending points. Therefore, the work for an object travelling in a closed path is zero, since its starting and ending points are the same:

If the field is conservative, the work done can be more easily evaluated by realizing that a conservative vector field can be written as the gradient of some scalar potential function:

The work done is then simply the difference in the value of this potential in the starting and end points of the path. If these points are given by x = a and x = b, respectively:

See also
 Field line
 Force
 Force field (technology)
 Psychokinesis
 Stasis field
 The Force
 Tractor beam

References

External links 

 Conservative and non-conservative force-fields, Classical Mechanics, University of Texas at Austin

Force